Cantonale elections to renew the first series of cantons general councillors were held in France on 15 and 22 March 1998.

Electoral system

The cantonales elections use the same system as the regional or legislative elections. There is a 10% threshold (10% of registered voters) needed to proceed to the second round.

Change in control

From right to left

 Aisne
 Allier
 Ardèche
 Finistère
 Gers
 Meurthe-et-Moselle
 Nord
 Puy-de-Dôme
 Pyrénées-Orientales
 Essonne
 Haute-Saône

National results

Sources

E-P

1998
1998 elections in France